Goniglossum wiedermanni is a species of tephritid or fruit flies in the family Tephritidae, and the only species in the genus Goniglossum.

Taxonomy
This species is sometimes included in the genus Carpomya.

Description
These fruit flies have an elongate head, with a long proboscis. Thorax is yellowish with dark brown markings. Scutellum has three usually isolated black spots. Abdomen is yellow to reddish-brown, without black bands, but with golden-yellow margins of tergites  2–4 in male, 2–5 in female. The last tergite is bare and shiny. Wings are hyaline, with brown bands.

Distribution
This species is present in Austria, Belgium, the British Isles, France, Germany, Hungary, Italy, Russia, Spain, Switzerland, and in the Near East.

Biology
Adults can be seen from May to August, with a  peak period in July. They feed on nectar of Bryonia dioica.

This species  is host-specific to white bryony (Bryonia alba, Bryonia dioica)  (Cucurbitaceae), in which berries larvae develop.

References

External links
 Flickriver
 INPN
 Biodiversidad Virtual

Insects described in 1826
Diptera of Europe
Insects of the Middle East
Trypetinae